Show Me the Way to Calvary is a studio album by American recording artist Wanda Jackson. It was released in 1981 via Christian World Incorporated and contained a total of ten tracks. It was the twenty seventh studio album released in Jackson's music career and her first to be released with the Christian World label. It would later be re-released in the United Kingdom.

Background, content and release
Wanda Jackson became commercially successful through a series of Rockabilly and country music recordings in the 1950s, 1960s, and 1970s. This included songs like "Let's Have a Party (1960), "In the Middle of a Heartache" (1962) and "Tears Will Be the Chaser for Your Wine" (1967). She later recorded gospel music for the Word and Myrrh labels in the 1970s. 

After gospel recording contract ended, Jackson retreated temporarily into domestic life before resuming her career in 1979. During this period she released a series of gospel and country albums on independent labels, which included Show Me the Way to Calvary. The project was recorded in Oklahoma City, Oklahoma at the Associated Recording Studio in 1981. The sessions for the project were produced by Don Johnson.  

The album comprises ten tracks. It is a collection of gospel recordings, including a cover version of Dottie Rambo's "I Go to the Rock" and Jackson's own composition named "My Testimony". The album was first released in 1981 on the Christian World label as a vinyl LP. It was re-issued in the United Kingdom on Word Records in 1982 under the title My Testimony. It was also issued as a vinyl LP with an identical track listing to the original release.

Track listing

Personnel
All credits are adapted from the liner notes of Show Me the Way to Calvary.

Musical personnel
 Terry Blankenship – Bass
 Paul Bowman – Drums
 Rocky Gribble – Acoustic guitar, lead guitar
 Jerry Hall – Steel guitar
 Wanda Jackson – Lead vocals
 Don Johnson – Piano
 Linda Matheson – Background vocals
 Carolyn McCoy – Background vocals
 Dale McCoy – Background vocals

Technical personnel
 Laura Chance – Production
 Melanie Harlan – Hair stylist
 Don Johnson – Conductor, producer
 David Powell – String and brass arrangements
 Mark Stevens – Production
 Carl Warren – Engineer
 Debbie Wray – Art direction

Release history

References

1981 albums
Wanda Jackson albums
Word Records albums